Mike Wellman is a former center in the National Football League. He was drafted in the third round of the 1979 NFL Draft by the Los Angeles Rams and would play two season with the Green Bay Packers.

References

1956 births
Living people
People from Newton, Kansas
Green Bay Packers players
American football centers
Kansas Jayhawks football players